Ak-Say may refer to the following places in Kyrgyzstan:

Ak-Say, Chüy, a village in the Chüy Region
Ak-Say, Issyk-Kul, a village in the Issyk-Kul Region